BKH may refer to:

Blackheath railway station, London, National Rail station code
Pacific Missile Range Facility, Kekaha, IATA and FAA LID airport code
Kogo language, Cameroon, ISO 639-3 code